Paul Joyce (born 1940, or 1941 or 1944) is a British photographer and filmmaker. His portraits of artists are held in the collection of the National Portrait Gallery, London and his Welsh landscape photographs are held in the collection of Amgueddfa Cymru – National Museum Wales.

Life and work
Joyce was born in Winchester, Hampshire.

Between 1976 and 1979 he visited Wales on several occasions, resulting in a touring exhibition and a catalogue. He is the author of two books based on conversations with David Hockney.

In 1977, Joyce directed a production of The Caretaker by Harold Pinter at Greenwich Theatre.

Publications

Books by Joyce
From Edge to Edge: Photographs of the Welsh Landscape. London: Lucida, 1983. . Exhibition catalogue.
Hockney on Photography: Conversations with Paul Joyce. London: Cape/Random House, 1988. .
Hockney on Art: Conversations with Paul Joyce. New York; London: Little, Brown. 2000;  / 2008; .

Books with contributions by Joyce
About Seventy Photographs. Arts Council of Great Britain, 1980. .
Time Pieces: A Dublin Memoir. Dublin: Hachette, 2016. By John Banville, with photographs by Joyce. .

Film and television 
Warriors' Gate, Doctor Who (1981) – directed by Joyce

Solo exhibitions
Paul Joyce: Photographs of Elders, National Portrait Gallery, London, 1977/78
Edge to Edge – Photographs of the Welsh Landscape. Toured by the Welsh Arts Council. Curated by Colin Ford.

Collections
Joyce's work is held in the following permanent collections:
Arts Council Collection, UK
Government Art Collection, UK
Amgueddfa Cymru – National Museum Wales, Cardiff: 12 landscape prints (as of 12 September 2021)
National Portrait Gallery, London: 51 prints of artists (as of 12 September 2021)
Tate, London: 1 print (as of 12 September 2021)

References

External links

20th-century British photographers
English film directors
Artists from Winchester
Living people
1940s births
Mass media people from Winchester